Vay or VAY may refer to:

Places
 Vay, Loire-Atlantique, a commune in France
 South Jersey Regional Airport, Mount Holly, New Jersey, United States
 Vay, a village in Ka Choun commune, Veun Sai District, Cambodia

People 
 Adelma Vay (1840–1925), Hungarian spiritualist and medium
 Ilus Vay (1923–2008), Hungarian film and television actress
 Miklós Vay (1802–1894), Hungarian politician
 Vay Wilson (1912–1962), Australian rugby union player

Other uses
 VAY AG, a Swiss computer vision company
 Vay (video game), a 1994 role-playing video game
 Vayu language (ISO 639:vay), a Kiranti language of Nepal
 "Vay-K", a 2014 song by English-Irish musician Tara McDonald

See also

 Vea (disambiguation)
 Vey (disambiguation)